The Fed Cup Asia/Oceania Zone Group I is the first stage of the Zonal Groups from the Asia/Oceania to determine who will advance to the World Group I – Play-offs involving teams from Asia and Oceania, and who will be relegated to the World Group II Play-offs.

Participating teams

Pools

Pool A

Kazakhstan vs. Hong Kong

China vs. India

Kazakhstan vs. India

China vs. Hong Kong

China vs. Kazakhstan

India vs. Hong Kong

Pool B

Japan vs. Thailand

Chinese Taipei vs. South Korea

Japan vs. South Korea

Chinese Taipei vs. Thailand

Chinese Taipei vs. Japan

Thailand vs. South Korea

References 

Asia/Oceania Zone Group I

2018 Fed Cup Asia/Oceania Zone